LaGrave Field is an abandoned baseball park in Fort Worth, Texas. It was primarily used for baseball and was the home field of the Fort Worth Cats independent minor league baseball team. Its original version was the home of the predecessor Panthers/Cats team of the Texas League from 1926–1958; the American Association in 1959; and then in the Texas League again in 1964. It also served as the part-time home of the Dallas Rangers during 1960–1962. The ballpark was rebuilt during 2001 and opened in 2002 after the club played one season at Lon Goldstein Field.

The ballpark sits on land bounded by a parking lot and then North Calhoun Street (southwest, first base); Northeast 6th Street (if extended) (southeast, right field); Northeast 7th Street (if extended) (northwest, third base); and the banks of a branch of the Trinity River (northeast, left field). The imaginary line running from home plate through second base runs roughly east-southeast.

During the team's inaugural 2014 season, LaGrave Field hosted home games for the Fort Worth Vaqueros FC of the National Premier Soccer League.

History
LaGrave Field opened in 1926 replacing Panther Park, which had been opened in 1911, and was located on the "west side of North Main Street, a few blocks from" the eventual LaGrave Field. Panther Park, in turn, had replaced Haines Park, located on the southeast corner of Pine Street and Pacific (now Presidio) Street (per city directories).

After winning consecutive Texas League championships during 1919–1925, the club owners decided to build a new ballpark, which was named for the club's principal owner, Paul LaGrave. It turns out that the last year of the old ballpark was also the last year of the Panthers/Cats string of league titles, but the club would go on to win several more league titles in the 1930s and 1940s.

Early in the 1949 season, on May 15–16, the ballpark was attacked on several fronts by a destructive fire and then rains and floods. The ballpark was rebuilt and rededicated in time for the 1950 season.

After baseball left the city in 1965, the site languished for years, but parts of it remained. When the site was rebuilt during 2001, the original dugouts were retained and renovated as dugout suites, making LaGrave the only ballpark in America to house "four dugouts". The original location of home plate was also retained.

Even at that, the ballpark was planned to be only a temporary site, to be replaced by an $8 million USD stadium owned by the Fort Worth Sports Authority; however that plan never materialized, due to soil contamination and water pollution at the city-owned site

Recent financial challenges
In February 2010, former Fort Worth Cats owner Carl Bell defaulted on $30 million in notes with LaGrave Field as collateral. Although Amegy Bank had the right to foreclose on the field and some of the adjacent acreage, the bank did not decide to immediately exercise that right. Former owner Bell also owed over $195,000 USD in property taxes and penalties for 2010 and sought a buyer for the stadium

A scheduled (January 3, 2012) foreclosure auction was averted due to a Chapter 11 Bankruptcy filing by LaGrave Reconstruction Company Several months later, the debt holder Amegy Bank of Houston finally completed foreclosure and became the landlord of the Cats.

On Tuesday, October 2, 2012 it was announced that LaGrave Field had been bought by an affiliate of the team's new ownership group for $4.5 million USD. The Cats eventually folded following the 2014 season.  The facility has since been abandoned and vandalized, and in July 2017 the park suffered a fire in a concession stand.

Members of Baseball's Hall of Fame

A sign outside the field states the following information:

Additional Uses
 The southeast end of the stadium's parking lot serves as an official parking area for the Tarrant County Courthouse.
 Texas Wesleyan University, an NAIA University also in Fort Worth, played home games at LaGrave Field.
 LaGrave Field also hosted various community events such as outdoor concerts, Boy Scout campouts and auto swap meets.

References

External links
 A photo of the original LaGrave Field
 Anglea Sports Fields

Sports venues in Fort Worth, Texas
Baseball venues in the Dallas–Fort Worth metroplex
Minor league baseball venues
Soccer venues in Texas
National Premier Soccer League stadiums
2002 establishments in Texas
Sports venues completed in 2002
College baseball venues in the United States